The 2018 Turkish Basketball Cup was the 33rd edition of the national cup competition for men's basketball teams in Turkey. The tournament was held from 14–18 February 2018 at the Sinan Erdem Dome in Istanbul, Turkey. Anadolu Efes won their 11th title.

Qualified teams 
After the first half of the 2017–18 Basketbol Süper Ligi the top eight teams qualified for the tournament. The four highest placed teams played the lowest seeded teams in the quarter-finals.

Bracket

Final

See also 
2017–18 Basketbol Süper Ligi
2017 Turkish Basketball Presidential Cup

References 

Turkish Cup Basketball seasons
Cup